The 14 Bristol and Exeter Railway 4-2-4T locomotives were broad gauge 4-2-4T steam locomotives built to three different designs. The first entered service in 1853. The Bristol and Exeter Railway was amalgamated into the Great Western Railway on 1 January 1876, and the last of the 4-2-4Ts was withdrawn in 1885.

The distinctive designs by James Pearson, the railway company's engineer, featured single large flangeless driving wheels and two supporting bogies. The water was carried in both well and back tanks, leaving the boilers exposed in the same way as tender locomotives.

The three types are distinguished by the size of driving wheel; the early  wheels being replaced by smaller ones on later designs.

List of locomotives

9 feet

 39 (1853–1868)
 40 (1853–1873)
 41 (1853–1873)
 42 (1854–1868)
 43 (1854–1871)
 44 (1854–1870)
 45 (1854–1870)
 46 (1854–1870)

The first of Pearson's 4-2-4Ts were eight locomotives built by Rothwell and Company in 1853 and 1854 and were all withdrawn by 1873.

The large wheels gave these locomotives a good turn of speed, 81.8 mph being reported on one train descending Wellington Bank in Somerset.

7 feet 6-inch

 12 (1862–1885) GWR No. 2005
 29 (1859–1880) GWR No. 2006

These two locomotives were built as replacements for more conventional 2-2-2 express passenger locomotives with  driving wheels and were given wheels of this same size, rather than the  wheels of their 4-2-4T predecessors.

No. 29 was the first locomotive built at the Bristol and Exeter Railway's new Bristol workshops in 1859. It had slightly larger  cylinders and a  wheelbase. When withdrawn in 1885 it was the end of Pearson's 4-2-4Ts.

No. 12 followed in 1862 and returned to  cylinders and had a slightly shorter  wheelbase.

8 feet 10-inch

 39 (1868–1876) GWR No. 2001
 40 (1873–1877) GWR No. 2002
 41 (1868–1877) GWR No. 2003
 42 (1868–1877) GWR No. 2004

Four of the 9-foot locomotives were replaced by these "renewals", built in the Bristol and Exeter Railway workshops at Bristol. A pair of their new 8-foot-10-inch-diameter driving wheels can be seen at Swindon Steam Railway Museum.

No. 39, recently renumbered as GWR 2001, derailed at Long Ashton near Bristol on 27 July 1876 and was withdrawn from service. While the poor condition of the track was a contributing factor, it was decided to rebuild the remaining three express 4-2-4Ts to more conventional 4-2-2 tender locomotives.

References

 
 
 
 
 
 

Broad gauge (7 feet) railway locomotives
4-2-4T locomotives
Bristol and Exeter Railway locomotives
Railway locomotives introduced in 1853
Scrapped locomotives
Passenger locomotives